Sir Robert Hitcham's Almshouses are grade II* listed almshouses in New Road, Framlingham, Suffolk, England.

They were built in 1654 under the will of Sir Robert Hitcham using materials from the demolished buildings of Framlingham Castle.

References 

Grade II* listed buildings in Suffolk
Grade II* listed houses
Almshouses in Suffolk
Framlingham
Buildings and structures completed in 1654